is a railway station on the Tadami Line in the town of Kaneyama, Ōnuma District, Fukushima Prefecture, Japan, operated by East Japan Railway Company (JR East).

Lines

Station layout
Aizu-Kawaguchi Station has a single island platform connected to the station building by a level crossing. The station is staffed.

Platforms

History
The station was absorbed into the JR East network upon the privatization of the Japanese National Railways (JNR) on April 1, 1987. 

Due to damage caused by torrential rainfall on July 30, 2011, services between Aizu-Kawaguchi and Tadami stations were replaced by a provisional bus service. The closed section resumed operations on 1 October 2022.

Passenger statistics
In fiscal 2017, the station was used by an average of 57 passengers daily (boarding passengers only).

Surrounding area
Numazawa Lake
Kaneyama Town Hall
Kawaguchi Post Office
Tadami River

Bus routes
Aizu Bus
For Oashi via Showa Onsen

See also
 List of railway stations in Japan

References

External links

 JR East station information 

Railway stations in Fukushima Prefecture
Tadami Line
Railway stations in Japan opened in 1956
Stations of East Japan Railway Company
Kaneyama, Fukushima